The Sampo is a magical artifact in Finnish mythology

Sampo may refer to:

Sampo (personal name)

Companies
 Sampo Bank, a Finnish banking company
 Sampo Corporation, a Taiwanese manufacturer of electronic and home appliance products
 Sampo Group, a Finnish insurance company
 Sampo, a trademark of the former Finnish company Rosenlew, currently a trademark of Sampo-Rosenlew

Music
 "Sampo", a song by Amberian Dawn on the 2010 album End of Eden
 "Sampo", a song by Amorphis on the 2009 album Skyforger

Transport
 Sampo (1898 icebreaker), a Finnish icebreaker built 1898
 Sampo (1960 icebreaker), a Finnish icebreaker built 1960

Others
 Sampo (brachiopod), a fossil brachiopod genus
 Sampo (district), a city area of Tampere, Pirkanmaa, Finland
 Sampo (film), a 1959 Soviet-Finnish film
 2091 Sampo, a main-belt asteroid
 Sampo generation, a South Korean social trend

See also